Lionsbridge Football Club, or Lionsbridge FC, is an American soccer club based on the Virginia Peninsula, which comprises the cities of Newport News, Hampton, Poquoson, and York and James City counties. The club was founded in 2017, and play in USL League Two. The club's colors are blue, black and white, and the club is named for the Lions Bridge, the iconic Peninsula landmark that has stood along the James River and in the Mariners' Museum Park since 1923. The team plays its home games at TowneBank Stadium on the campus of Christopher Newport University.

Background 

The original founders include Mike Vest, Kevin Joyce, and Dan Chenoweth, all of whom are Virginia Peninsula residents. Lionsbridge FC announced its launch on June 9, 2017 via a social media release. At the time of the team's announcement, the club invited fans to help determine its crest via a fan vote on social media. More than 600 people voted  and the team unveiled the winning design in July 2017. The crest integrates four identifying features of the Virginia Peninsula - the Lions Bridge, the team's location and launch year, the James and York Rivers, and the region's importance as a hub of the United States military.

Lionsbridge FC announced its league affiliation (Premier Development League) and TowneBank Stadium (then known as Pomoco Stadium) agreement (with Christopher Newport University) during a press conference on November 14, 2017.

The team named Chris Whalley as its first head coach on February 14, 2018.

Notable Former Players 
 2018-19  Ivan Militar - Academy Director for El Paso Locomotive in USL Championship.

 2018  Tom Devitt – Gateshead FC, Blythe United, Stranraer FC, Hebburn Town

 2018  Josh Spencer – Hinckley A.F.C.

 2018  Joe Rice – Richmond Kickers, New England Revolution II, Loudoun United FC, Detroit City FC.

 2018  Fortia Munts – Valentine Eleebana Phoenix (Australia), Unio Esportiva Vic

 2018, 2020-21  Simon Fitch – Richmond Kickers

 2019  JP Scearce – Union Omaha

 2019  Adrian Rebollar - Monterey Bay FC in USL Championship.

 2019-20  Rich Dearle - Eltham Redbacks in Australia.

 2019  Oscar Ramsay – Charlotte Independence, North Shore United

 2019  Luke Brown – Hitchin Town FC, Stowmarket Town FC

 2019  Rene White – Real Salt Lake of MLS 

 2019  Thibaut Jacquel – FC Dallas of MLS  and CS Fola Esch in Luxembourg.

 2020  Alex Touche – New Mexico United of USL Championship and Union Omaha of USL League One.

 2021  Matthew Bentley – MLS Draft Pick of Minnesota United, Dover Athletic and Richmond Kickers in USL League One.

Year by year

Honors
 USL League Two Best Regular Season Record Champions: 2022
 USL League Two Chesapeake Division Champions: 2022
 USL League Two Franchise of the Year: 2019
 USL League Two Eastern Conference Attendance Leaders: 2018, 2022
 USL League Two Southern Conference Attendance Leaders: 2019, 2020, 2021

Jersey sponsors 

Lionsbridge FC's inaugural season sponsors included Chick-fil-A (Official Jersey Sponsor), Riverside Health System (Official Sports Medicine Provider), Planet Fitness (Official Health Club), Nike (Official Apparel Supplier) and Financial Security Group.

References 

Soccer clubs in Virginia
2017 establishments in Virginia
Association football clubs established in 2017
Sports in Newport News, Virginia